Henry Sewell (born 21 August 1935) is a Jamaican cricketer. He played in three first-class matches for the Jamaican cricket team from 1957 to 1960.

See also
 List of Jamaican representative cricketers

References

External links
 

1935 births
Living people
Jamaican cricketers
Jamaica cricketers
People from Saint Ann Parish